White Crow is the second studio album by the Dutch rock/melodic metal band La-Ventura.

Personnel
La-Ventura
Mike Saffrie - bass
Stefan Simons - drums
Carla van Huizen - vocals
Sascha Kondic - guitars
Guest/session musicians
Jos Houtzager - additional keys
Miscellaneous staff
Didier Chesneau - producer
Iris Compiet - art direction
Manon Koopman- photography
Eddy de Putter- artwork
Bruno Gruel - mastering

Track listing

Note(s)
Recorded and mixed at MII Recording Studio, France, 2010–2012.
Mastered by Elektra Mastering, France, 2012. 
Special edition 6 panel digipack, with 16-page booklet and 2 bonustracks. 
Videos were made for "Falling Down" and "Song for an Idiot".

References

2013 albums
La-Ventura albums